Perazhagi  is a 2018 Tamil-language soap opera which is directed by Pon Ilango and starring Gayathri, Viraat (actor), Dipti sree, VJ Saravana Kumar, Manjula Paritala,  and Porkodi. It aired on Colors Tamil from 20 February 2018 – 21 December 2019. The story about young girl Pothum Ponnu explores the social impacts of skin colour.

Synopsis
Pothum Ponnu Childhood

A young girl called Pothum Ponnu (Played by Dipti Sree) is always jovial and smiling. However, people from her society dislike her due to her dark skin color and how short she is, bringing her self-esteem down and upsetting her. However, she overcomes this and tries to forget the negative comments. During these times, her mother Parvathy (Played by Porkodi) has always supported her.

Podhum Ponnu Present

Pothum Ponnu is now in Chennai due her to problems in her hometown. However, using this opportunity, she tries find work in Chennai. Unfortunately, she is not able to find work due to some problems . However, due to her uprising spirit, she was able to preserve herself to become an actress by overcoming the problems she faced which lead her to become the main heroine of the mega movie "Kaviya Thalaivi".

Cast

Main
 Gayathri Raj as Pothum Ponnu / Kayal (Episode: 11 − present)
 Deepthi Sri  as Young Pothum Ponnu (Episode: 1 − 11)
 Viraat (actor) as Prithvi − Kayal's husband
 VJ Saravana Kumar as Karthick , Assistant Director ; Kayal Best Friend , Sheela husband

Recurring
 C. Ranganathan as Paramashivam a.k.a. Shivam − Prithvi's car driver
Manjula Paritala as Nethra (Main Antagonist)
Sujatha Panju as Janaki − Prithvi's mother
 Geetha Ravishankar as Kamatchi − Prithvi's maternal aunt
 Ravishankar as Vishwanathan − Prithvi's maternal uncle; Janaki's brother; Kamatchi's husband
 Issac Varkees as Aaruchami − Kayal's father
 Porkodi as Parvathy − Kayal's mother
 Preethi Pritu as Kavitha − Kayal's younger sister
 Unknown as Prem Kumar − Kayal's younger brother-in-law; Kavitha's husband
 Hensha Deepan as Prem's sister
 Subbalakshmi as Vellaiamma − Kayal's paternal grandmother
 Tarun Master as Nagureddy − Film director
 Mithun as John − Nethra's arch-rival
 Keerthi Jai Dhanush as Sudha − An actress
 Unknown as Sheela − Junior actress
 Unknown as Shantha
 Indhu Ravichandran as Kalai − Kayal's childhood friend
 Sowmiya Ravindran as Vaani − Kayal's friend
 Unknwon as Latha − Kayal's aunt
 Unknown as Saraswathi − Aaruchami's younger sister
 Gowri Jaanu as Maha − Aaruchami's elder sister

Title song

Soundtrack

References

External links
 Colors Tamil Official Facebook in Tamil
 Colors Tamil Official Youtube Channel in Tamil

Colors Tamil original programming
Tamil-language children's television series
2018 Tamil-language television series debuts
Tamil-language television shows
2010s Tamil-language television series
2019 Tamil-language television series endings